= George Akers (footballer) =

English football player

Personal information
- Place of birth: Clitheroe, England
- Position: Forward

Senior career*
Years	Team	Apps	(Gls)
1932	Preston North End	1	(0)
- * Club domestic league appearances and goals

George Akers was a footballer who played in The Football League for Preston North End.
